Midrange computers, or midrange systems, were a class of computer systems that fell in between mainframe computers and microcomputers.

This class of machine emerged in the 1960s, with models from Digital Equipment Corporation (PDP line), Data General (NOVA), Hewlett-Packard (HP3000) widely used in science and research as well as for business - and referred to as minicomputers. 

IBM favored the term "midrange computer" for their comparable, but more business-oriented systems.

IBM Midrange Systems 
 System/3 was the first IBM midrange system (1969)
 System/32 (introduced in 1975)  was a 16-bit single-user system also known as the IBM 5320.
 System/34 (1977) was intended to be a successor to both the 3 and the 32.
 System/38 (1979) was the first midrange system to have an integrated relational database management system (DBMS). The S/38 had 48-bit addressing, and ran the CPF operating system.
 System/36 (1983) had two 16-bit processors with an operating system that supported multiprogramming.
 AS/400 was introduced under that name in 1988, renamed eServer iSeries in 2000, and subsequently became the IBM System i in 2006. It runs the OS/400 operating system.
 IBM Power Systems were introduced in April 2008, a convergence of  IBM System i and IBM System p.

Positioning
The main similarity of midrange computers and mainframes - they are both oriented for decimal-precision computing and high volume input and output (I/O), but most midrange computers have an (reduced and specially designed) internal architecture with limited compatibility to mainframes. The low-end mainframe can be more affordable and less powerful that a hi-end midrange system, but midrange system still was a "replacement solution" with another service process, different OS and internal architecture. 

The difference between similar-size Midrange and Supermini/Minicomputer - is a computing purposes: Super/mini oriented for float-point scientific computing, midrange - for decimal business-oriented computing, but without clear distinction border between classes.

Earliest midrange computers was a single-user business calculation machines; the virtualization, typical feature of mainframes since 1972 (partially from 1965), was ported to midrange systems only in 1977; the multi-user support was added to midranges in 1976 instead of 1972 for mainframes (but that's still a significantly earlier that a limited release of x86 virtualization (1985/87) or multi-user support (1983)).

Latest midrange systems are primarily mid-class multi-user local network servers that can handle the large-scale processing of many business applications. Although not as powerful and reliably as full-size mainframe computers, they are less costly to buy, operate, and maintain than mainframe systems and thus meet the computing needs of many organizations.  Midrange systems was relatively popular as powerful network servers to help manage large Internet Web sites, but more oriented for corporate intranets and extranets, and other networks.  Today, midrange systems include servers used in industrial process-control and manufacturing plants and play major roles in computer-aided manufacturing (CAM).  They can also take the form of powerful technical workstations for computer-aided design (CAD) and other computation and graphics-intensive applications.  Midrange system are also used as front-end servers to assist mainframe computers in telecommunications processing and network management.

Since the end of 1980s, when the client–server model of computing became predominant, computers of the comparable class are instead usually known as workgroup servers and online transaction processing servers to recognize that they usually "serve" end users at their "client" computers. For the 1990-2000's, in some non-critical cases both lines also was replaced by web servers, oriented for working with global network, but with less security background, and mainly based using General purpose architecture (currently x86 or ARM).

See also

 IBM mainframe
 Superminicomputer
 Minicomputer
 Microcomputer
 List of IBM products

References

Midrange